The women's doubles competition of the racquetball events at the 2011 Pan American Games will be held from October 17–22 at the Racquetball Complex in Guadalajara, Mexico. The defending Pan American Games champions are Susana Acosta and Rosa Torres of Mexico, while the defending Pan American regional champion from 2011 is Paola Longoria and Samantha Salas also of Mexico.

Schedule
All times are Central Standard Time (UTC-6).

Round robin

The round robin will be used as a qualification round. Groups will be announced at the technical meeting the day before the competition begins.

Pool A

Pool B

Pool C

Playoffs

References

Racquetball at the 2011 Pan American Games
Racquetball at multi-sport events